Muhammad Ibn Sirin (born in Basra) was a Muslim tabi' who lived in the 8th century CE. He was a contemporary of Anas ibn Malik. He is claimed by some to have been an interpreter of dreams, though others regard the books to have been falsely attributed to him. Once regarded as the same person as Achmet son of Seirim, this is no longer believed to be true, as shown by Maria Mavroudi.

Biography
According to Yehia Gouda's reference book on Muslim oneiromancy Dreams and Their Meanings (published in 1991), Abu Bakr Muhammad Ibn Sirin Al-Ansari (33-110 AH;  653–728), was born in Basra, as mentioned, in  653, i.e., the 33rd year after Muhammad's leaving from Makkah to the then Medina. His birth came two years before the end of the rule of Caliph Uthman ibn Affan.

Muhammad's father (the name Abu Bakr was seldom used) was one of the many captives taken by Khalid ibn al-Walid after the Battle of Ayn al-Tamr. He was a coppersmith from a town called Jirjaya (Gerzhiya) (Arabic:  جرجرايا, south east of Baghdad), settled and working there, where a decisive battle took place in year 12. According to the Encyclopedia of Islam (London; Leiden & E.J. Brill, 1971), vol. 3, p. 947, Ibn Sirin's mother, Safiyya – a servant of the caliph Abu Bakr – was held in such esteem within the community that when she died, her laying-out was performed by three of Muhammad's wives and eighteen Badris (veterans of the battle of Badr), led by Ubay ibn Ka'b, were present at her burial. 'Umar sent him as a present, either directly to Anas ibn Malik (one of the most authoritative sources on the life and opinions expressed by Muhammad) or first to a man called Talha Al-Bukhari (from Bukhara, Central Asia) who, in turn, gave him to Anas.

Works
The most notable of the books attributed to him is Dreams and Interpretations.  Ibn Al-Nadim says that he was the author of Taabir Al-Ro'oya (Interpretation of Dreams), which is different from or an abridged version of Muntakhabul Kalam Fi Tafsir El Ahlam (A Concise Guide for the Interpretation of Dreams) first printed in Bulaq, Egypt, in 1284 AH, in Lucknow in  1874 and in Bombay in 1296 AH.  It was subsequently reprinted numerous times in various parts of the Arab World under different titles.

But that book, allegedly written by Ibn Sirin, who died in 110 AH, comprises many discrepancies (anachronic passages). For instance, it tells a story about Imam Shafi'i who died in 204 AH. It also quotes Is'haq Ibrahim ibn 'Abdullah Al-Kirmani, who died in 400 AH.

The rare second edition in Italian of his interpretation of Egyptian and Persian dreams was translated from Leo Toscano's Latin into Italian by the famous cheiromantist Patricio Tricasso, who, in his foreword to Alessandro Bicharia, explains that he has omitted many of the original interpretations owing to many dreams being inspired either by melancholy or evil spirits. The original Arabic, Greek and Toscano's Latin texts seem not to have survived and this is the second of three Italian editions of the sixteenth century, the others appearing in 1525 and 1551.

See also
 Psychology in medieval Islam

References

External links 

Ibn Sirin Dictionary Of Dreams
tafsir ahlam Ibn Sirin

Iraqi writers
Iraqi coppersmiths
Mujaddid
People from Basra
7th-century Arabs
8th-century Arabs
653 births
728 deaths
Tabi‘un
Tabi‘un hadith narrators